The 1926 New Hampshire Wildcats football team was an American football team that represented the University of New Hampshire as a member of the New England Conference during the 1926 college football season. In its 11th season under head coach William "Butch" Cowell, the team compiled a 4–4 record, and were outscored by their opponents, 90–81. The team played its home games in Durham, New Hampshire, at Memorial Field. This was the first season with Wildcats as the official nickname of the school's sports teams, having been adopted in February 1926.

Schedule

 New Hampshire and the Quantico Marines practiced together in Durham for two weeks in September, including a scrimmage on September 18. The game played on September 25 was won by the Marines, 24–0. The game is not listed by the Wildcats' media guide or College Football Data Warehouse, possibly because players for the Marines were members of the active military rather than college students.

Notes

References

New Hampshire
New Hampshire Wildcats football seasons
New Hampshire Wildcats football